Shaul Nehemia Eisenberg (22 September 1921 – 27 March 1997) was a Jewish businessman and billionaire tycoon.

Biography

Shaul Eisenberg was born in Munich to a religious Jewish family from Poland, being the fifth out of six children born to Sophie (née Katz) and David Eisenberg. His mother was from Krakow and his father was from Warsaw. Shortly after the uprising of the Nazis in the government, he fled to Shanghai. While in Tokyo, Eisenberg met and married Leah Freudlsperger, a half-Japanese woman who was the daughter of an Austrian painter, and the couple had five daughters and a son.

Eisenberg died in Beijing in 1997, two years before the expiration of the Eisenberg Law.

After his death, the family fought over the inheritance, valued at around 1 billion dollars. His son continued to operate the family business. Eisenberg's brother, Rafael, who was a Hasidic scholar, died in 1976, leaving twelve children.

Business career
During World War II he worked with industrial factories, associating with the Axis Power countries. After the war ended, he began working with American businesses, importing iron products for the Japanese steel industry, when at the same time exporting a variety of Japanese-made products to India.

At the start of the 1950s, Eisenberg expanded his business to other countries in the Far East, especially South Korea, where he invested money while mediating between the local authority to manufacturers from the East that were also doing business there. Among them were: British Electric, Siemens, MAN SE, and Fiat Automobiles. Within a decade, he managed to mediate a vast variety of projects, such as developing production lines for recycled paper and purchasing airplanes and trains. He got an award from the Korean government for his actions. Until the mid-1960s, Eisenberg was the primary factor and catalyst in the commerce between South Korea and Japan to Western countries.

Eisenberg founded the company Israel Corporation, and a new law was enacted for him, allowing the company to have a tax break for 30 years. The law, which got its nickname from Eisenberg, was meant to encourage entrepreneurs. Upon getting these benefits, Eisenberg began mimicking his international actions and do them in Israel as well, which led him to settle in Savyon, Israel. With Israel Corporation he began purchasing some holdings in the companies Zim Integrated Shipping Services, Oil Refineries, and others.

At the same time he took advantage of his connections to do military transactions between the Far East and Israel, and also became an exporter of weapons from Israel to countries in Africa and South America. Later on he was the first person to do commercial business between Israel and China.

Eisenberg was a significant donor to political parties, influencing the Israeli politics.

In 1979, Eisenberg founded "Beit Asia" in Tel Aviv, where he located his stock market investments' headquarter, owned by Eisenberg's Group. Jonathan Zohovsky, his daughter's husband, as well as Michael Albin, who was the manager of the group, assisted him. After the Israeli 1983 stock market crash, the group had significant losses, and later on the police found that the company had been hiding information from its stockholders. He later died in tragic reasons, and Eisenberg disconnected his relationship with his daughter and her husband. In the 1990s, his business activity began to slow down, due to involvement of other markets in the Far East and other factors.

References

1921 births
1997 deaths
German emigrants to Japan
German Jews
German people of Polish-Jewish descent
Israeli billionaires
20th-century Israeli Jews
Israeli people of Polish-Jewish descent
Arms traders
20th-century Israeli businesspeople
Immigrants to Israel
Japanese emigrants
German expatriates in China